Cynosurus echinatus is a species of grass known by the common names bristly dogstail grass, rough dog's-tail and hedgehog dogtail. It is native to southern Europe, and it is known in the Americas and Australia as an introduced species and sometimes a noxious weed. An herbicide-resistant strain can be found growing as a weed in canola and wheat fields in Chile. This is an annual grass growing 10 to 50 centimeters tall. The inflorescence is a rounded or oval cluster or series of clusters of spikelets. The fertile spikelet has an awn up to a centimeter long. The awns clumped closely together into a tuft gives the inflorescence its bristly, hairy appearance.

References

External links
Jepson Manual Treatment
Grass Manual Treatment
Photo gallery

Pooideae
Bunchgrasses of Europe
Flora of Southeastern Europe
Flora of Southwestern Europe
Plants described in 1753
Taxa named by Carl Linnaeus